Pearl "Polly" Adler (April 16, 1900 – June 9, 1962) was an American madam and author, best known for her work A House Is Not a Home, which was posthumously adapted into a film of the same name. In 2021, Pulitzer Prize-winning historian Debby Applegate published a comprehensive account of Adler's life and times entitled Madam: The Biography of Polly Adler, Icon of the Jazz Age with Doubleday.

Early life

Of Russian-Jewish origin, Pearl Adler was the eldest of nine children of Gertrude Koval and Morris Adler, a tailor who travelled throughout Europe on business. Her early education was from the village rabbi.

The family was living at Yanow (a city that was then part of Imperial Russia, but which is now in western Belarus, near the Polish border) when, with the number of pogroms increasing, her parents sent her, at age 13, to accompany a cousin to America. Halfway through the journey, her cousin decided to turn back at the first opportunity, ultimately leaving Adler on her own.

World War I delayed the rest of her family from immigrating to America until after the end of the war. The war also prevented her from receiving the monthly allowance sent by her father. She lived for a time with family friends in Springfield, Massachusetts, where she cleaned house and attended school and, at age 14, began working in the local paper mill; the following year she moved to Brooklyn, living for a time with cousins. Adler worked as a seamstress and at clothing factories and sporadically attended school. At the age of 17, while working in a corset factory for $5 a week, she was raped by her foreman and became pregnant. She found a doctor who was charging $150 to perform abortions. The doctor took pity, when she said she only had $35 and accepting only $25 told her to "take the rest and buy some shoes and stockings." Ostracized by her cousins, she moved to Manhattan and continued working in a factory.

At 19, she began to enjoy the company of theater people in Manhattan, and became an apartment mate of an actress and showgirl on Riverside Drive in New York City. The street was known in the city's Yiddish slang as "Allrightnik’s Row", suggesting that its residents had "made it". Her new friends were involved in vaudeville, Broadway revues, Tin Pan Alley, burlesque and the even sleazier underbelly of show business. They gave Pearl the nickname "Polly."

At this very apartment, in 1920, she was introduced to Nicolas Montana, whose business was procuring women to work in brothels. Montana set Adler up in a furnished, two-room apartment across from Columbia University, where Polly soon began to procure prostitutes for Montana and his friends, earning $100 a week for her troubles. One evening, Adler was arrested and charged with procuring, but the case was dismissed for lack of evidence. After a brief attempt to run a lingerie shop, she returned to her previous role in the sex industry, determined to succeed with it. This time, she made a point of befriending the police, slipping a $100 bill into a cop's palm whenever she shook his hand.

Bordello owner
As Adler's business grew, she invested in a series of improvements, moving to grander accommodations and updating the interiors where necessary.

One building in which she plied her trade was The Majestic, at 215 West 75th Street, designed by architects Schwartz and Gross and completed in 1931. It included a bar styled to resemble the recently excavated Tutankhamun's tomb, a Chinese Room where visitors could play mahjong and a Gobelin tapestry as well as hidden stairways and secret doorways.

Her brothel's patrons included Peter Arno, Harold Ross, Desi Arnaz, George S. Kaufman, who had an account and would pay for the services rendered at the end of each month, Robert Benchley, Donald Ogden Stewart, Dorothy Parker, who would chat with Adler while her male friends partook of the services, Milton Berle, John Garfield, New York City mayor Jimmy Walker, gossip columnist Walter Winchell  and mobster Dutch Schultz.

There has been speculation that New York State Supreme Court justice Joseph Force Crater, who vanished on August 6, 1930, died in Adler's brothel.

Adler was a shrewd businesswoman with a mind for marketing. She determined that gaining publicity would be to her advantage, and she cultivated newspaper coverage by dressing flamboyantly, making grand appearances at nightclubs and drawing attention to her beautiful employees. She also made large bribes to city and law enforcement officials to keep her business open. Adler's brothels were distinguished by drink from the best bootleggers, food from her own private cooks, good hygiene and well-selected, mostly working-class girls. It was reported that during the early days of the Depression, Adler was able to turn away up to 40 young women for every one she hired.

In the early 1930s, Adler was a star witness of the Seabury Commission investigations and spent a few months in hiding in Florida to avoid testifying. She refused to give up any mob names when apprehended by the police.

Adler retired in 1945, later attending high school and earning an associate degree at Los Angeles City College. In 1953, she published a bestselling memoir, ghost-written by Virginia Faulkner. A House Is Not a Home was published by Rinehart and Co. and sold two million copies in both hard cover and mass-market paperback. Her notoriety led her to be included in Cleveland Amory's 1959 Celebrity Register. She died of lung cancer in Los Angeles in 1962. A House Is Not a Home was made into a movie two years later, starring Shelley Winters as Adler.

Trials

Spring 1935 
During Fiorello La Guardia's time as a mayor, Polly Adler and three of her girls were brought to court. She pleaded guilty and was subsequently sentenced to 30 days in jail (of which she served 24, scrubbing the jail floors in May and June 1935) and paid an additional $500 fine.

"A plea of guilty was entered for Polly Adler in Special Sessions yesterday to a charge of possessing a 'motion picture machine with objectionable pictures' in her East Fifty-fifth Street apartment when it was raided by the police last March 5."

"Another unexpected plea of guilty to maintaining an objectionable apartment at 30 East Fifty-fifth Street blocked in Special Sessions yesterday the trial of Polly Adler on that and another charge that she kept an 'obscene motion picture film' in the suite last March when it was raided."

January 1943 

"Polly Adler is in the prison ward of Bellevue Hospital, it became known yesterday, awaiting a hearing for the seventeenth time for maintaining a house of prostitution."—

"A charge of keeping and maintaining a house for prostitution against Pearl Davis, better known as Polly Adler, was dismissed by Magistrate Thomas H. Cullen in Woman's Court yesterday after the court ruled that police had failed to establish a case."—

Television and film portrayals 

Shelley Winters portrayed Adler in the 1964 film version of Adler's book. The 1989 Perry Mason TV-movie Musical Murder revolved around a faux-musical based on Adler. Adler was portrayed by the actress Gisèle Rousseau in the 1994 film Mrs. Parker and the Vicious Circle.

The television show M*A*S*H episode "Bulletin Board" features a party/picnic called the "First Annual Polly Adler Birthday Cook-out Picnic and Bar-B-Que", with all proceeds going to Sr. Teresa's Orphanage. The picnic scene climaxes with a tug of war between the officers and enlisted men. In the episode "Goodbye, Cruel World", Colonel Potter asks "Why does my company clerk's office look like Polly Adler's parlor?" after Corporal Klinger does some redecorating with items sent from home.

Death
Adler died of cancer in Cedars of Lebanon Hospital in Los Angeles, California. She is buried in the Maimonides section of Mt. Sinai Memorial Park in Los Angeles.

At 62 years old, she left her mother and 6 brothers behind, as well as rumors of an unfinished sequel to her book.

Autobiography

Editions

Translations
 
 Polly Adler: Madam P. und ihre Mädchen, Lichtenberg Verlag, München, 1965

References 

 ,

Further reading 

1900 births
1962 deaths
People from Ivanava District
People from Kobrinsky Uyezd
20th-century Belarusian Jews
Emigrants from the Russian Empire to the United States
American autobiographers
American brothel owners and madams
American female organized crime figures
Jewish American gangsters
Women autobiographers
20th-century American women writers
20th-century American non-fiction writers
20th-century American businesspeople
20th-century American businesswomen
American women non-fiction writers
People from the Upper West Side
20th-century American Jews